Borso or Borsò is an Italian given name and surname.  Notable people with the name include:

 Borso d'Este, Duke of Ferrara (1413-1471), Italian duke, first Duke of Modena, commissioned the Borso d'Este Bible
 János Borsó (b. 1953), retired Hungarian international footballer
 Umberto Borsò (1923-2018), Italian operatic tenor

See also 
 Borso del Grappa, municipality in Treviso, Italy
 Borsos